Griff may refer to:

People
 Griff (name), a list of people with the given name or surname
 Griff (singer), stage name of English singer and songwriter Sarah Faith Griffiths (born 2001)
 Nickname of Guy Griffiths (1915–1999), British Second World War Royal Marine pilot and prisoner of war
 Professor Griff, stage name of American rapper Richard Griffin (born 1969)
 Emyr Morus Griffith (1923–1995), half of the Miki & Griff British country music duo
 Griff Rhys Jones, Welsh comedian, writer, actor and television presenter

Fictional characters
 Griff Tannen, in the 1989 film Back to the Future Part II
 Griff, in the 2017 film Baby Driver
 Griff (Rave Master), in the Japanese manga and anime series Rave Master
 Griff, in the television series Married... with Children
 Griff, Gargoyles clan member in the Disney animated series Gargoyles
 Griff Reynolds, in British soap opera Coronation Street

Places
 Griff, Warwickshire, England, a hamlet
 Griff Creek, California, United States

Other uses
 Griff (TV series), an American television series (1973–1974) starring Lorne Greene
 Nuneaton Griff F.C., a football club based in Nuneaton, Warwickshire, England
 Griff., the botanical author abbreviation for William Griffith (botanist) (1810–1845), British botanist

See also
 Griff's Hamburgers, an American regional fast food chain founded in 1960 by Griff's of America, Inc.
 Grif (disambiguation)
 Griffin (disambiguation)
 Groff (disambiguation)
 McGriff, a list of people with the surname